A total of 183 electoral districts existed from 1947 to 1989 in Sri Lanka. The country's 1978 Constitution introduced a new proportional representation electoral system for electing members of Parliament from 1989 onwards. The existing 160 single-member, double-member and triple-member districts were replaced with 22 multi-member electoral districts, similar to the existing administrative districts of Sri Lanka. The remaining 160 districts by 1989 continues to be a polling division of the current multi-member electoral districts.

List

Notes

References